"Early One Morning" is a blues rock song written by Little Richard. It was originally released on his album The Fabulous Little Richard, and released by Specialty Records as a B-side single to "She Knows How to Rock" in November 1958. The song derives from "Wee Baby Blues" by Big Joe Turner. Turner's version features Ray Charles on piano, and was released as a single on Atlantic Records in 1957.

Critical reception 
Billboard (November 17, 1958): The shoutin' cat is at his best on these sides. "Early One Morning," the great blues standard, is given a wild reading against driving ork support. "She knows," the flip, is a fast blues swinger that is also solidly belted. Both sides are safe bets to score heavily in both pop and r.&b. marts.

Ike & Tina Turner version 
Ike & Tina Turner recorded a version of "Early One Morning" for their 1973 album Let Me Touch Your Mind. Their rendition was released by United Artists Records as the B-side to the non-album track "With A Little Help From My Friends." While the A-side didn't chart, "Early One Morning" reached No. 47 on the Billboard R&B chart and No. 60 on the Cash Box R&B chart.

Chart performance

Other versions 

 Mo Jo Buford Blues Band released a version as a single in 1977
 The Zombies performed a version which was released on the album Live on The BBC (1985)

References 

1958 songs
1958 singles
Little Richard songs
Songs written by Little Richard
Specialty Records singles
1973 singles
Ike & Tina Turner songs
United Artists Records singles
Song recordings produced by Ike Turner
The Zombies songs